Franzburg-Richtenberg is an Amt in the district of Vorpommern-Rügen, in Mecklenburg-Vorpommern, Germany. The seat of the Amt is in Franzburg.

The Amt Franzburg-Richtenberg consists of the following municipalities:
Franzburg
Glewitz
Gremersdorf-Buchholz
Millienhagen-Oebelitz
Papenhagen
Richtenberg
Splietsdorf
Velgast
Weitenhagen
Wendisch Baggendorf

Ämter in Mecklenburg-Western Pomerania